Pavel Sergeyevich Ivashentsev (born 17 April 1988) is a former Russian professional football player.

Club career
He played two seasons in the Russian Football National League for FC SKA Rostov-on-Don and FC KAMAZ Naberezhnye Chelny.

External links
 
 

1988 births
Living people
Russian footballers
Association football defenders
FC Rostov players
FC Taganrog players
FC SKA Rostov-on-Don players
FC KAMAZ Naberezhnye Chelny players
PFC Krylia Sovetov Samara players